Trendz may refer to:

 Trendz (album), a 1993 album by Trends of Culture
 Trendz (group), a South Korean boy band